Paulo Cesar Duque-Estrada (born November 22, 1956) is a Professor of Contemporary Philosophy and Associate Vice-President for Academic Affairs (Graduate Programs and Research) at the Pontifical Catholic University of Rio de Janeiro (PUC-Rio).  He has served as executive secretary (2010–2011), vice-president (2011–2012) and president (2012–2013) of the National Forum of Associate Vice-Presidents for Research and Graduate Programs (FOPROP).

He is an expert in Continental philosophy, and his research revolves around Heidegger, Gadamer, Levinas and Paul Ricoeur. A leading interpreter of the philosophy of Jacques Derrida, he was the first scholar to bring Derridean thought to the field of philosophy within the academic environment in Brazil.

Early life and education 
Born in Rio de Janeiro into an intellectual family, he is the great-grandson of French feminist Joséphine Bouju, assistant of Jean-Martin Charcot, and grandson of prominent journalist and politician Generoso Ponce Filho, owner of the Brazilian branch of RKO Pictures.

He received both his B.A. and M.A. from PUC-Rio, and his Ph.D. from Boston College. Later, as a visiting scholar, he developed a post-doctoral research on the subject of hermeneutics and deconstruction at the New School for Social Research, New York.

Work 

Duque-Estrada has published extensively on topics related to ethics, language, subjectivity and other contemporary socio-political issues. A frequently invited lecturer and speaker at several institutions such as Södertörn University, Birkbeck, University of London, Bonn University, Fordham University, Concordia University, among others, he is also actively involved in promoting and strengthening ties between post-graduate research and governmental and non-governmental funding agencies.

In 2002 he founded, along with a group of diverse researchers from various academic backgrounds, the NEED- Núcleo de Estudos em Ética e Desconstrução, dedicated to transdisciplinary research in Deconstruction.

Selected bibliography

See also
Deconstruction
List of deconstructionists

References

Brazilian philosophers
Deconstruction
21st-century philosophers
Living people
Academic staff of the Pontifical Catholic University of Rio de Janeiro
1956 births